Skënder Luarasi (19 January 190027 April 1982) was an Albanian scholar, writer and anti-fascist activist.

Life
Luarasi was born in Luaras of Kolonjë region (back then Ottoman Empire, today's Albania) on 19 January 1900. He was the son of Albanian patriot Petro Nini Luarasi, descendant of the Kostallari family of the Luaras village, and Lino Sevo. Though Luarasi was a Protestant, he named his son Skënder to refer to the Albanian National Hero Scanderbeg. The poet Naim Frashëri was his godfather.
Luarasi performed the first studies in Albanian-language schools of Negovan and Korçë (1909-1911). After the death of his father by poisoning, he was sent to Robert College of Istanbul (1912-1913). Luarasi would continue his studies at Easton Academy in US (1914-1916), International College in Springfield, MA in US (1916-1918), Classis Gymnsium in Freistadt, Austria, (1922-1926) and graduated from the Faculty of Philology at University of Vienna, Austria in 1930. During his return in Albania (1920-1922) he worked as a teacher in the schools opened by American Red Cross in Elbasan District.

Luarasi started his literary activity since 1917. During the 30s he would distinguish himself as teacher, critic, journalist, translator, playwright, and director and cooperator of several press periodicals. He was editor-in-chief of the periodicals Studenti ("The Student"), 1920 in US, Djalëria ("Boyhood"), Austria, 1927-1928, and the magazine Vullnetari i Lirisë ("Volunteer of Freedom"), Spain, 1937, together with Petro Marko. The last was a 20-page periodical of Albanian volunteers participating in the Spanish Civil War as anti-fascists.
During the years 1930-1936 Luarasi taught at the Technical School of Tirana, Vlora, and Shkodra, until he left for Spain to join the International Brigades. He had been previously arrested and imprisoned three time by the Zogist regime.
During the Italian and German Occupation he was arrested and interned in several concentration camps, including Vernet, Gurs, St.Cyprien, etc.

After World War II, he was elected representative of Kolonje region in the Albanian Assembly (1945). Luarasi was one of the initiator of the foundation of Albanian League of Writers and Artists and member of the presidium until November 1949 when he was expelled for several years from the League due to his anti-conformist behavior. 

Until his retirement (1967), he worked as teacher and historian in the State Pedagogic Commission, Qemal Stafa High School, the Publishing Company of the Science Institute, Pedagogical School, "Jordan Misja" Artistic Lyceum, and Faculty e History-Linguistics of the University of Tirana ( where he established the English language major). 
Until 1992, his activity focused on publicistics, monographs, theatrical plays, historical and literary studies.

Luarasi was awarded "Flag Order" (1960) and  "Honor of the Nation" (1996) by the Albanian government with the motivation "For distinguished patriotic, anti-fascist, democratic, literary, and educative activity".

Luarasi died on 27 April 1982. Several schools in Albania and Kosovo are named after him.

Main works

Studies, monographs, memoirs 
Isa Boletini, short biography, Prishtina, "Rilindja" 1972. OCLC 43365281
Ismail Qemali, biography, Tirana, Shtëpia Botuese e Librit Politik, 1972. OCLC 80727030
Les soeurs Qiriasi, study, Tirana, 1962. OCLC 79170189
Kolonel Thomson, monograph
Petro N. Luarasi, jeta dhe vepra, study, Tirana, "Naim Frashëri", 1958. OCLC 560911213
Migjeni, jeta dhe vepra, study, Tirana,  "Naim Frashëri", 1961. OCLC 462044090
Gjerasim Qiriazi, jeta dhe vepra, study, Tirana, Naim Frashëri, 1962. OCLC 28785711
Sevasti Qiriazi, vepra, study
Në Brigadat internacionale, memories, Tirana, Toena, 1996. OCLC 37228386 
Fjala shqipe, study, Tirana, "Naim Frashëri", 1961. OCLC 462053473
Fjala e lirë shqipe (publicistikë e studime), study
Kujtime historike, memoirs
Kujtime autobiografike (Ç'kam parë e ç'kam dëgjuar), autobiographic collection
Tri jetë, Koloneli Tomson - Ismail Qemali - Isa Boletini, collection of biographies, Tirana, "Migjeni", 2007.

Theatrical plays
Agimi i Lirisë (Freedom's Dawn)
Stuhi në prill (Storm in April)

As co-author
Zgjimi Kombëtar Shqiptar : 1878-1912 (Albanian National Awakening), Stavro Skëndi; Skender Luarasi; Nestor Nepravishta, Tirana, Phoenix : Shtëpia e Librit dhe e Komunikimit, 2000,

Translations to Albanian
Enoch Arden by Alfred Tennyson, "Shtypshkronja Tirana", 1936.
King Lear by Shakespeare, Prishtina, "Rilindja", 1968. OCLC 503885742
Richard III by Shakespeare, Prishtina, "Rilindja", 1968. OCLC 503889228
The Merchant of Venice by Shakespeare, Prishtina, "Rilindja", 1968. OCLC 503895560
Scanderbeg by Thomas Whincop, Shtëpia Botonjëse "Naim Frashëri", 1967. OCLC 504060109
Oliver Twist by Charles Dickens, Prishtina, 1961, OCLC 558205528
The Song of Hiawatha by Henry Wadsworth Longfellow, Tirana, 1960. OCLC 562688044
Faust by Johann Wolfgang von Goethe, Tirana, Ndërmarrja shtetrore e botimeve, 1957. OCLC 163308588
Fuente Ovehuna by Lope de Vega, Prishtina, "Rilindja", 1980. OCLC 441739925
Götz von Berlichingen by Johann Wolfgang von Goethe, Tirana, "Naim Frashëri", 1959. OCLC 43129221
Intrigue and Love by Friedrich Schiller, Tirana, Ndërmarrja shtetërore e botimeve, 1955. OCLC 796248147
Childe Harold's Pilgrimage by Byron, Tirana, Ndermarrja Shteterore e Botimeve, 1956. OCLC 248867971
Emilia Galotti by Gotthold Ephraim Lessing, Tirana, "Naim Frashëri", 1962. OCLC 72370973
Leaves of Grass by Walt Whitman, Tirana, Ndërmarrja Shtetërore e botimeve, 1956. OCLC 660230353
William Tell by Friedrich Schiller, Tirana, Shtëpia botuese "Naim Frashëri", 1975. OCLC 77886954
Albania: Its discontents and their origin by Frederick Morton Eden (1865-1948), Tirana, Infbotues, 2011.

See also
Robert Shvarc
Dhimitër Shuteriqi
Aleksandër Xhuvani
Eqerem Çabej
Kristo Luarasi

References

Albanian writers
Albanian translators
English–Albanian translators
German–Albanian translators
Robert College alumni
People from Kolonjë
People from Janina vilayet
1900 births
1982 deaths
Albanian people of the Spanish Civil War
20th-century translators